Washington Park is a historic public park and national historic district located on Lake Michigan at Michigan City, LaPorte County, Indiana.  The park encompasses 13 contributing buildings, 3 contributing sites, 11 contributing structures, and 21 contributing objects, and includes the Michigan City Zoo.  It was established in 1891 and later developed by the Works Progress Administration and its predecessors during the 1930s. Notable features include the Soldiers' and Sailors' Monument (1896), former park headquarters building (1934), bandstand (1911), World War I doughboy monument (1926), tennis court (c. 1933), log picnic shelter (c. 1936), and four-story observation tower (1936).

It was listed in the National Register of Historic Places in 1991.

References

Parks in Indiana
Works Progress Administration in Indiana
Historic districts on the National Register of Historic Places in Indiana
1891 establishments in Indiana
Rustic architecture in the United States
Historic districts in LaPorte County, Indiana
National Register of Historic Places in LaPorte County, Indiana
Parks on the National Register of Historic Places in Indiana